The following is a list of awards and nominations received by Pushing Daisies.

Emmy Awards

Primetime Emmy Awards

Creative Arts Emmy Awards

Golden Globe Awards

Satellite Awards

Saturn Awards

Writers Guild of America Awards

Hollywood Post Alliance Awards

Other awards

References

External links
 Awards and nominations for Pushing Daisies at the Internet Movie Database

Awards
Pushing Daisies